The Bennington Street Burying Ground is a historic cemetery on Bennington Street, between Swift St. and Harmony St., in East Boston, Massachusetts.

The cemetery was established in 1838, in a late version of the traditional rectilinear colonial cemetery, rather than the rural cemetery style that was then just beginning to come into vogue.  The cemetery has more than 300 graves, the oldest dating to 1819 (probably a reburial from another location).  The cemetery was listed on the National Register of Historic Places in 2002.

The professional baseball player Red Woodhead was interred at the cemetery in 1881.

See also
 National Register of Historic Places listings in northern Boston, Massachusetts

References

External links
 Profile at City of Boston
 
 
 

Cemeteries in East Boston
Cemeteries on the National Register of Historic Places in Massachusetts
East Boston
National Register of Historic Places in Boston